Peter Denahy (born 1972) is an Australian entertainer from Yackandandah, Victoria, Australia. He sings and plays guitar,  mandolin and fiddle. His most successful song was "Sort of Dunno Nothin'" which was a hit on YouTube and made the ARIA Top 100. It was on his Picture In A Frame album which made the top 30 of the ARIA Country Albums chart. Peter is married to Alison Denahy.

Discography

Albums

Charting singles

Awards

Country Music Awards of Australia
The Country Music Awards of Australia (CMAA) (also known as the Golden Guitar Awards) is an annual awards night held in January during the Tamworth Country Music Festival, celebrating recording excellence in the Australian country music industry. They have been held annually since 1973.
 (wins only)
|-
| 2011
| "Every Time He Travels Through Cloncurry"  (Written by Pete Denahy, Recorded by Luke Austen)
| Bush Ballad of the Year
| 
|-
| 2013
| Yackandandah1852
| Instrumental of the Year
| 
|-
| 2014
| "Cotton Eyed Joe"
| Instrumental of the Year
| 
|-
| 2016
| "Cluck Old Hen"
| Instrumental of the Year
| 
|-
| 2016
| "Singin' Shoes"
| Bluegrass Recording of the Year
|

Tamworth Songwriters Awards
The Tamworth Songwriters Association (TSA) is an annual songwriting contest for original country songs, awarded in January at the Tamworth Country Music Festival. They commenced in 1986. Peter Denahy has won four awards.
 (wins only)
|-
| 1993
| "Cantankerous Gramaphone" by Peter Denahy 
| Comedy/ Novelty Song of the Year 
| 
|-
| 2000
| "Bruce the Spider" by Peter Denahy 
| Comedy/ Novelty Song of the Year 
| 
|-
| 2001
| "The Dung Beetle" by Peter Denahy 
| Comedy/ Novelty Song of the Year 
| 
|-
| 2022
| Peter Denahy 
| Songmaker Award 
| 
|-

References

External links
Pete Denahy website

Living people
1972 births
Australian guitarists
Australian ukulele players
Mandolinists
21st-century Australian singers
21st-century guitarists
21st-century Australian male singers
Australian male guitarists